Mark Faumuina (born 2 October 1971) is a former Western Samoa international rugby league footballer.

Playing career
An Otahuhu Leopards junior, Faumuina represented Auckland, playing for the Under 17's in 1987 and the under 18's in 1991.

In 1993 Faumuina played for the Probables side in the New Zealand national rugby league team trial match. He did not however make the national side.

In 1994 he played for the Auckland City Vulcans in the new Lion Red Cup. He was then picked to be part of the Western Samoan side as it conducted a tour of New Zealand. He then played in the 1994 Pacific Cup.

In 1995 Faumuina played for the Counties Manukau Heroes. He was picked to play for the Lion Red XIII against a Tongan Residents side and also represented Auckland in its Rugby League Cup challenge.

Faumuina played against the touring Great Britain side in 1996, again representing the New Zealand Residents. He then signed a contract with the Penrith Panthers but did not make the first grade side.

Faumuina later played in France before retiring. In 2003 he played for a French Selection against a touring New Zealand Māori side.

References

Living people
New Zealand rugby league players
Samoa national rugby league team players
Auckland rugby league team players
Counties Manukau rugby league team players
1971 births
Otahuhu Leopards players
Villefranche XIII Aveyron coaches
Villefranche XIII Aveyron players
Rugby league props
Rugby league second-rows